Alexander Archer (10 April 1828 – 28 February 1890) was an Australian banker and one of the Archer brothers.

Early life 
Alexander Archer was born on 10 April 1828 in Larvik, Norway. He was the younger brother of Archibald Archer (1820–1902) and Thomas Archer (1923–1905).

He was educated at Perth, Scotland.

Bank of New South Wales 

He left for Victoria in 1852, where he was appointed agent for the Bank of New South Wales at the "Ovens" goldfield (now Beechworth). He joined the bank on 21 June 1853.

He became manager at Kyneton, Victoria, in 1854, at Brisbane, Queensland, in 1864, and Inspector in 1867.

In 1857, Alexander purchased 100 acres of land in Victoria which included Hanging Rock.

In 1871, he married Mary Louisa, the eldest daughter of Sir Robert Ramsay Mackenzie.

RMS Quetta 
After thirty-six years' service in the Bank, he left for England by the RMS Quetta, in February 1890, accompanied by his wife, and on the 28th of the month both were lost in the wreck of that ship at the entrance to Torres Strait.

References 

1828 births
1890 deaths
People from Larvik
Australian bankers